Adult Contemporary is a chart published by Billboard ranking the top-performing songs in the United States in the adult contemporary music (AC) market.  In 1965 the chart underwent a significant change.  Since its first publication in 1961, the listing had been compiled by simply extracting from the magazine's all-genre chart, the Hot 100, those songs which were deemed of an appropriate style and ranking them according to their placings on the Hot 100.  At the start of 1965, the chart used this methodology and was published under the title Middle-Road Singles.  The title changed to Pop-Standard Singles in the issue of Billboard dated May 1.  With effect from the issue dated June 5, 1965, however, the magazine dropped the Pop-Standard listing and began compiling an Easy Listening top 40 wholly independently of the Hot 100, based on playlists submitted by easy listening radio stations and sales reports submitted by stores.  At the time, Billboard promoted the revamped listing as a brand new chart, with each song in the June 5 issue shown as being in its first week on the chart, but the magazine now regards the charts before and after the methodology change as one unbroken lineage.

On the first chart of 1965, the number one song was "The Wedding" by British singer Julie Rogers, which held the top spot for three weeks before being replaced by another British act, Chad & Jeremy, with their single "Willow Weep for Me".  The longest unbroken run at number one during 1965 was ten weeks, achieved by Roger Miller with "King of the Road".  The highest total number of weeks achieved by an artist was the 12 weeks which Elvis Presley spent in the top spot with "Crying in the Chapel", "(Such an) Easy Question" and "I'm Yours".  Presley was the only artist with more than one Easy Listening number one during the year, although all three of his chart-toppers were older songs which were not released as singles until 1965.  "Crying in the Chapel", which had been recorded in 1960 but never previously released, held the number one position on the first chart compiled under the new methodology in June.

The final number one of the year was "Make the World Go Away" by Eddy Arnold.  Like "King of the Road" earlier in the year, Arnold's song also reached the top position on Billboards Hot Country Singles chart.  None of 1965's Easy Listening number ones topped the Hot 100, which at the time was largely dominated by the rock and roll-influenced style of acts associated with the so-called British Invasion, such as the Beatles and the Rolling Stones.

Chart history

References

See also
1965 in music
List of artists who reached number one on the U.S. Adult Contemporary chart

1965
1965 record charts